Rupchand Pal (2 December 1936 – 16 August 2022) was an Indian politician and a member of the Communist Party of India (Marxist). He was elected to the 7th Lok Sabha in 1980 from Hooghly constituency in West Bengal. He was re-elected to the Lok Sabha in 1989, 1991, 1996, 1998, 1999 and 2004, from the same constituency.

References

External links
 Official biographical sketch in Parliament of India website

1936 births
2022 deaths
Communist Party of India (Marxist) politicians from West Bengal
People from Hooghly district
India MPs 1980–1984
India MPs 1989–1991
India MPs 1991–1996
India MPs 1996–1997
India MPs 1998–1999
India MPs 1999–2004
India MPs 2004–2009
Lok Sabha members from West Bengal